1970 Білий птах з чорною ознакою / White Bird with Black Mark, directed by Yuriy Illienko
 1971 Захар Беркут / Zakhar Berkut, directed by Leonid Osyka (by the story of Ivan Franko)
 1971 Червона рута / Chervona Ruta, directed by Roman Oleksiv (musical featuring Sofia Rotaru and Vasyl Zinkevych)
 1972 Пропала Грамота / The Lost Letter, directed by Borys Ivchenko
 1973 У бій ідуть лише «старі» / Only Old Men are Going to Battle, directed by Leonid Bykov
 1974 Марина / Maryna, directed by Borys Ivchenko
 1975 Пісня завжди з нами / Song is Always with Us, directed by Viktor Storozhenko (musical featuring Sofia Rotaru)
 1976 Ати-бати, йшли солдати... / Aty-baty, Soldiers were Going..., directed by Leonid Bykov
 1976 Тривожний місяць вересень / The Troubled Month of Veresen, directed by Leonid Osyka
 1977 Весь світ в очах твоїх... / All the World is in Your Eyes, directed by Stanislav Klymenko
 1978 Море / Sea, directed by Leonid Osyka
 1979 Дударики / Dudaryky, directed by Stanislav Klymenko
 1979 Вавілон XX / Babylon XX, directed by Ivan Mykolaichuk

1970s
Films
Ukrainian